The 1970–71 DFB-Pokal was the 28th season of the annual German football cup competition. It began on 12 December 1970 and ended on 19 June 1971. 32 teams competed in the tournament of five rounds. In the final Bayern Munich defeated 1. FC Köln 2–1 after extra time. It was Bayern's fifth triumph in the cup while it was Cologne's second consecutive loss in the final.

Mode
The tournament consisted of five single elimination rounds. In case a game ended with a draw 30 minutes of extra time were played. If the score was still level the game was replayed with 30 minutes of extra time in case of another draw. For the first time a penalty shootout was held if no winner could be determined after the replay.

Matches

First round

Replays

Round of 16

Replay

Quarter-finals

Semi-finals

Final

References

External links
 Official site of the DFB 
 Kicker.de 
 1971 results at Fussballdaten.de 
 1971 results at Weltfussball.de 

1970-71
1970–71 in German football cups